The Supreme Court Reports (S.C.R.) is the official reporter of the Supreme Court of Canada. Since the creation of the Supreme Court, all of its decisions have been published in the Reports, in both English and French. The first volume was published in 1877 containing the first case ever heard by the Supreme Court, Kelly v. Sullivan. 

Initially, the reports were identified from 1 to 64, but from 1923 they have been identified by their year of publication. By 1975 the reporter started putting out two volumes a year, which increased to between 3 and 4 by 1990. Volumes from 1983 and later are also available in electronic format, hosted by LexUM at the Université de Montréal.

External links
 lexum database of Supreme Court Reports

Case law reporters of Canada
Supreme Court of Canada